Agha Mohammad Khan Qajar (14 March 1742 – 17 June 1797), also known by his regnal name of Agha Mohammad Shah, was the founder of the Qajar dynasty of Iran, ruling from 1789 to 1797 as king (shah). Originally chieftain of the Quwanlu branch of the Qajar tribe, Agha Mohammad Khan was enthroned as the king of Iran in 1789, but was not officially crowned until March 1796, having deposed Lotf Ali Khan of the Zand dynasty in 1794. Agha Mohammad Khan Qajar was famously the eunuch Monarch, being castrated as a young adult upon his capture by Adel Shah Afshar, and hence was childless. He was assassinated on 17 June 1797, and was succeeded by his nephew, Fath-Ali Shah Qajar.

Agha Mohammad Khan's reign is noted for the return of a centralized and unified Iran and for relocating the capital to Tehran, where it still stands today. He is also noted for his cruel and rapacious behavior, particularly during the re-subjugation of Georgia. He sacked the capital Tbilisi, massacred many of its inhabitants, and moved some 15,000 Georgian captives back to mainland Iran.

Early life (1742–1779)

Family and youth

Agha Mohammad Khan was born in Astarabad around 1742. He belonged to the Quwanlu (also spelled Qawanlu) branch of the Qajar tribe. The Qajars were one of the original Turkoman Qizilbash tribes that emerged and spread in Asia Minor around the tenth and eleventh centuries. They later supplied power to the Safavids since the dynasty's earliest days. The tribe had several other branches, one of the most prominent ones being the Develu, which often fought against the Quwanlu. Agha Mohammad Khan was the eldest son of the chieftain of the Quwanlu clan, Mohammad Hasan Khan Qajar, and the grandson of Fath-Ali Khan Qajar, a prominent aristocrat executed by the orders of Shah Tahmasp II (possibly compelled by Nader Qoli Beg, who came to be known as Nader Shah after usurping the throne of Iran in 1736, marking the foundation of the Afsharid dynasty). Agha Mohammad Khan had several half-brothers and full-brothers: Hossein Qoli Khan, Morteza Qoli Khan, Mostafa Qoli Khan, Reza Qoli Khan, Jafar Qoli Khan, Mehdi Qoli Khan, Abbas Qoli Khan and Ali Qoli Khan.

When Nader Shah died in 1747, the Afsharid rule of Iran fell apart, which gave Mohammad Hasan an opportunity to seize Astarabad for himself, leading Nader Shah's nephew Adel Shah to march from Mashhad to the city in order to capture him. Although he failed to capture Hasan, Adel Shah managed to capture Agha Mohammad Khan, whom he planned to kill. He later chose to spare Agha Mohammad Khan's life and instead had him castrated and thereafter freed. While the common spelling of "Agha" is usually used as a title roughly translated to "Sir" or "Mister", Agha Mohammad Khan's title is differently spelled, which is a common one among eunuchs who served at the court.

Death of Mohammad Hasan
During the following 10 years, Afsharid rule in Khorasan suffered heavily from war among rival chieftains and from invasions by the Durrani ruler of Qandahar, Ahmad Shah Durrani. During this period, Mohammad Hasan fought against the Pashtun military leader Azad Khan Afghan and the Zand ruler Karim Khan for suzerainty over the western part of Nader Shah's former empire. He was, however, defeated in 1759 by a Zand army. He was betrayed by his own followers and thereafter, killed by his old rival, Mohammad Khan of Savadkuh. Due to Agha Mohammad Khan's castration, his brother Hossein Qoli Khan was appointed as the new chieftain of the Quwanlu instead. Shortly thereafter Astarabad fell under the control of Karim Khan, who appointed a Develu named Hossein Khan Develu as its governor. Meanwhile, Agha Mohammad Khan and his brother Hossein Qoli Khan fled to the steppe. One year later, Agha Mohammad Khan made an incursion against Astarabad, but was forced to flee, chased by the city's governor. Agha Mohammad Khan managed to reach Ashraf, but was at last seized and was sent as a hostage to Tehran, ruled by Karim Khan. Hossein Qoli Khan was also soon captured and sent to Karim Khan.

Life at court

During his stay, Agha Mohammad Khan was treated kindly and honorably by Karim Khan, who made him convince his kinsmen to lay down their arms, which they did. Karim Khan then settled them in Damghan. In 1763, Agha Mohammad Khan and Hossein Qoli Khan were sent to the Zand capital, Shiraz, where their paternal aunt Khadija Begum, who was part of Karim Khan's harem, lived. Agha Mohammad Khan's half-brothers Morteza Qoli Khan and Mostafa Qoli Khan were granted permission to live in Astarabad, due to their mother being the sister of the governor of the city. His remaining brothers were sent to Qazvin, where they were treated honorably.

Agha Mohammad Khan was looked upon more as a respected guest in Karim Khan's court than a captive. Furthermore, Karim Khan also acknowledged Agha Mohammad Khan's political knowledge and asked his advice on interests of the state. He called Agha Mohammad Khan his "Piran-e Viseh", referring to an intelligent counselor of the mythical Turanian king Afrasiab in the Shahnameh epic. Two of Agha Mohammad Khan's brothers who were at Qazvin were also sent to Shiraz during this period. In February 1769, Karim Khan appointed Hossein Qoli Khan as the governor of Damghan. When Hossein Qoli Khan reached Damghan, he immediately began a fierce conflict with the Develu and other tribes to avenge his father's death. He was, however, killed ca. 1777 near Findarisk by some Turks from the Yamut tribe with whom he had clashed. On 1 March 1779, while Agha Mohammad Khan was hunting, he was informed by Khadija Begum that Karim Khan had died after six months of illness.

Rise to power (1779–1789)

Conquest of Mazandaran and Gilan

Agha Mohammad Khan took with him a group of loyal followers and left for Tehran. Meanwhile, in Shiraz, people were fighting among themselves. In Tehran, Agha Mohammad Khan met the main chieftains of the Develu clan, with whom he made peace. He visited the shrine of Shah Abd al-Azim, where his father's skull was kept. He then travelled to the Mazandaran Province, where his first task was to set up his suzerainty among his Quwanlu brothers. This resulted in a clash with his brothers Reza Qoli and Morteza Qoli, whom he defeated on 2 April, conquering Mazandaran. Meanwhile, Morteza Qoli fled to Astarabad, where he fortified himself. Agha Mohammad Khan could not simply storm the city, since starting a war with Morteza Qoli would mean that his frail alliance with the Develu could fall apart—Morteza Qoli's mother was a Develu. At the same time, the Zand prince Ali-Morad Khan Zand sent an army of Zand and Afghan troops under Azad Khan Afghan's son Mahmud Khan to Mazandaran, which Agha Mohammad Khan's brother Jafar Qoli Khan managed to repel. Agha Mohammad Khan, together with Hossein Qoli Khan's sons Fath-Ali Qoli and Hosayn Qoli, was now in a firm position in Babol, the capital of Mazandaran.

In Autumn 1780 Reza Qoli invaded Babol with an army of men from Larijan, where he encircled Agha Mohammad Khan's house and captured him after a fight lasting several hours. When Morteza Qoli learned of this, he marched to Babol on the 1st of January 1781 with an army of Turkmens and released Agha Mohammad Khan. The three brothers tried to settle their problems; Agha Mohammad Khan and Reza Qoli succeeded, while Morteza Qoli was discontented and fled to Ali-Morad Khan in Isfahan, and then to Sadeq Khan Zand in Shiraz. He died in Khorasan. His former supporters then went to Agha Mohammad Khan and began serving him. At that time, Agha Mohammad Khan had once again become involved in a conflict with his brother Reza Qoli, whom he defeated in several battles, and thereafter established peace with him once more: Morteza Qoli was allowed as the de facto ruler of Astarabad and several districts in the region of Hezar Jarib.

Peace did not last long. Ali-Morad Khan soon invaded Mazandaran, which led Agha Mohammad Khan to march from Babol with an army of Mazandaranis and Qajars and attack Ali-Morad Khan, whom he managed to repel from the province. Agha Mohammad Khan then seized Qumis, Semnan, Damghan, Shahrud and Bastam. Furthermore, he also made Hedayat-Allah Khan, the ruler of Gilan, his vassal. He thereafter granted land in Semnan to his brother Ali Qoli as a reward for his help in the conquest of the cities.

First conflict with the Russians, dispute with Gilan, and the invasion of northern Persian Iraq

In 1781, the Russian Empire, which was interested in building a trade route with Iran in order to be able to trade with regions deep into Asia, sent an emissary under Marko Ivanovich Voinovich to the coast of Gorgan, where he arrived on August 10 and sought approval to build a trading-post at Ashraf. When Agha Mohammad Khan refused, Voinovich ignored his refusal and went on to establish an interim settlement on Ashurada island. With no ships, Agha Mohammad Khan was unable to retake the island. Instead, he tricked Voinovich and some of his men into meeting him at Astarabad for a banquet on December 26, where they were held as captives until Voinovich agreed to order his men to leave Ashurada on January 13, 1782.

A year later Agha Mohammad Khan invaded Gilan, because its ruler Hedayat-Allah had changed his allegiance to the Zand dynasty. Hedayat-Allah then sent two diplomats, Mirza Sadeq and Agha Sadeq Lahiji, to Agha Mohammad to make peace. As a precaution he went to Shirvan. The diplomats were unable to come to favorable terms with Agha Mohammad Khan, who raided Gilan's capital Rasht and seized its riches. Rejoicing in his victory, he sent his brother Jafar Qoli Khan to conquer the northern part of Persian Iraq. He defeated a Zand army in Ray (or Karaj), and thereafter seized Qazvin. He then marched to Zanjan, which he also seized.In autumn they returned to Mazandaran. In the spring of 1783, Agha Mohammad Khan besieged Tehran, a town under Zand control which had proved troublesome. During the siege, plague started spreading in the town, and thereafter to Agha Mohammad Khan's army camp outside the city, which forced him to lift the siege.He marched back to Ali Bolagh, a summer house near Damghan. Agha Mohammad Khan then returned to Mazandaran and spent the winter there.

Mazandaran's brief submission to the Zand dynasty
The next year Ali-Morad Khan, in retaliation for Agha Mohammad Khan's attack on Tehran the previous year sent a huge army reportedly numbering 60,000 to Mazandaran in June 1784, aiming to crush the Qajars once and for all.  His 15-year-old son Sheikh Veis Khan was put in command of the army, with Ali Morad staying behind in Tehran. When the army arrived, its people quickly surrendered to the Zands and the nobles defected. Agha Mohammad Khan and a few of his supporters fled to Astarabad, where he tried to fortify the city as much as possible. Meanwhile, Morteza Qoli changed his allegiance and began serving the Zand dynasty. Ali-Morad Khan then sent an army numbering 8,000 under his relative Mohammad Zahir Khan to Astarabad, and laid siege to the city. Agha Mohammad Khan had already stocked provisions in case of a siege. Every day his troops would try to lay waste to the countryside to limit the besiegers' provisions. This in the end made the besiegers' situation unsustainable, and allowed Agha Mohammad Khan to leave the city to attack them. Mohammad Zahir Khan fled towards the Karakum Desert, but was captured by Agha Mohammad Khan's Yomut allies and was brutally killed.  Only a few of his men managed to survive. On the 14th of November Agha Mohammad marched from Astarabad into Mazandaran and defeated a Zand force at Ashraf. The Zands were unable to defend Sari and Sheikh Veis Khan fled to Tehran on November 23.

First war with Jafar Khan Zand

Meanwhile, Ali-Morad Khan had raised another group of Zand troops, which he sent to Mazandaran under the command of his cousin Rustam Khan Zand, only to be defeated by Agha Mohammad Khan. Ali-Morad Khan died on 11 February 1785. When Agha Mohammad Khan heard of his death, he went to Tehran to try to capture it. When he reached the city, the inhabitants quickly closed the gates, and told him that they would open the gate only for the king of Iran, who according to them was Jafar Khan Zand, who had succeeded Ali-Morad Khan. Thus Agha Mohammad Khan had to defeat Jafar Khan to be recognized as the king of Iran. He thereafter quickly marched towards Isfahan. Jafar Khan sent men to stop his advance towards the city, but they withdrew at Qom without putting up any resistance. Jafar Khan then sent an even larger Zand army towards Agha Mohammad Khan, who defeated the army near Kashan.  Jafar Khan then fled to Shiraz. Agha Mohammad arrived at Isfahan on May 2, where he discovered what was left of the Zand treasure and Jafar Khan's harem. The Qajar troops then looted the city.

During the summer of 1785, Agha Mohammad Khan made the city his headquarters for his expeditions in Persian Iraq. He left Isfahan on July 7 on a campaign in which he managed to bring the Bakhtiari chieftains under his suzerainty. He then left for Tehran on September 2, appointing a former Zand commander to govern. When he arrived at Tehran, the town finally submitted to him. At the same time, his men captured Hamadan and forced many Kurdish and Turkic chieftains to submit to Qajar rule. On 12 March 1786, Agha Mohammad Khan made Tehran his capital. By then the city had a population of 15,000–30,000 people. It appears that during this period, Agha Mohammad Khan saw himself as the king of Iran, although he avoided using the title "shah".

Some time later, while Agha Mohammad Khan Qajar was campaigning against the Bakhtiaris, Jafar Khan quickly marched towards Isfahan and re-captured it (although the citadel of Tabrak held out for four months). He then sent troops towards Kashan and Qom, while he marched towards Hamadan in early January 1786. He was, however, defeated by local tribal chieftains, among them Khosrow Khan and Mohammad Hosayn Khan Qaragozlu. Jafar Khan then withdrew to Isfahan to deal with a rebellion by the chiefs of Jandaq, who marched towards the city. The chiefs were defeated and submitted to Jafar Khan. When Agha Mohammad Khan heard about the Zand invasion of Isfahan and its surroundings, he quickly moved towards the city, which made Jafar Khan retreat to Shiraz once again. Agha Mohammad Khan then appointed Jafar Qoli Khan as the city's governor. However, the governor of Zanjan revolted shortly afterward, which forced Agha Mohammad Khan to go back north, where he suppressed the latter's revolt and pardoned him.

Second invasion of Gilan
Agha Mohammad Khan now had to focus on Gilan because Hedayat-Allah Khan had returned to the province (allegedly with Russian help) since the Qajar invasion of the province in 1782. In Agha Mohammad Khan's eyes, the whole Caspian coast was under threat by Hedayat-Allah and the Russians. Agha Mohammad Khan and his men easily managed to enter Gilan. While he was marching towards Rasht, he was joined by a local ruler named Mehdi Beg Khalatbari and other people. Furthermore, the Russian consul in Gilan betrayed Hedayat-Allah by providing weapons to Agha Mohammad Khan. Hedayat-Allah once again tried to flee to Shirvan, but was captured by men sent by a local ruler named Agha Ali Shafti (or another local ruler according to some sources), who killed him to avenge the slaughter of his family a few years earlier. Gilan was now completely under Qajar rule. Besides the conquest of Gilan, the second most valuable thing for Agha Mohammad Khan was Hedayat-Allah's treasure.

Second war with Jafar Khan Zand and enthronement

Some time later a local ruler named Amir Mohammad Khan, who with another local ruler named Taqi Khan (the ruler of Yazd), had recently defeated Jafar Khan and seized many riches, invaded Qajar territory, and marched towards Isfahan. Jafar Qoli Khan, who was still the governor of Isfahan, left the city before Taqi Khan could reach it and defeated the latter. Agha Mohammad Khan then went southwards once again. He met Jafar Qoli Khan at Isfahan in 1788, and after some time, made Taqi Khan accept Qajar suzerainty, and thereafter punished some Qashqai tribes, who fled into the mountains. Agha Mohammad Khan then approached Shiraz, where he hoped to bait Jafar Khan out of the city, which was strongly fortified, making it very hard to besiege. Unfortunately for him, Jafar Khan remained in the city. Agha Mohammad Khan returned to Isfahan, where he appointed his brother Ali Qoli as its governor, succeeding Jafar Qoli Khan. He then left for Tehran.

With Agha Mohammad Khan once again in the north, in autumn Jafar Khan began raising an army to prepare another attack against Isfahan and its surroundings. Jafar left Shiraz on September 20 and marched towards Isfahan. When Ali Qoli learned of it he sent a group of tribesmen to Qumishah, a city south of Isfahan. However, Jafar Khan easily defeated them. Ali Qoli thereafter retreated to Kashan.  Jafar Khan was then able to occupy Isfahan on October 20.  Agha Mohammad Khan, learning of this, marched rapidly towards Isfahan, which led Jafar Khan withdraw to Shiraz once again and reached the city on November 30. Agha Mohammad Khan returned to Tehran rather than attacking Shiraz again. Jafar Khan was murdered on 23 January 1789, which started a four-month civil war between several Zand princes who fought for succession to the throne. In May Jafar Khan's son Lotf Ali Khan emerged the victor in this civil war. Lotf Ali Khan fled to Bushehr and managed to recruit the local chiefs of Dashestan to his side. Lotf Ali was able to march against Sayed Morad Khan on April 22 and enter Shiraz on May 8.

It was also during this period that Agha Mohammad Khan was enthroned (however still not crowned) and named his nephew Baba Khan (who would later be known as Fath-Ali Shah Qajar) as his heir. Thus 1789 is marked as the start of his reign.

Reign (1789–1797)

War with Lotf Ali Khan, family disputes, and the first invasion of Azerbaijan

First attack on Shiraz and dispute with Jafar Qoli Khan Qajar
Now that the Zand dynasty was no longer under the rule of Jafar Khan Zand, Agha Mohammad Khan saw an opportunity to capture Shiraz once and for all. He marched towards the city, and as he neared it, was attacked by Lotf Ali Khan. A battle was fought on 25 June 1789, which ended in Lotf Ali Khan withdrawing to Shiraz while Agha Mohammad Khan followed him and besieged the city. The siege lasted until 7 September. He set up an encampment and returned to Tehran, where he stayed until the end of the ensuing Nowruz. On 17 May 1790, Agha Mohammad Khan once again marched towards Shiraz. When he reached Fars, the governor of Bihbahan acknowledged his authority. Lotf Ali Khan once again left Shiraz in order to stop Agha Mohammad Khan's advance, but the Qajar ruler withdrew to Qazvin and its surroundings, where he had to resolve some problems. Agha Mohammad Khan later quarreled with Jafar Qoli Khan, who saw himself as the best heir of the Qajar dynasty. Agha Mohammad had him executed, which he believed necessary having seen in the Zand family how quickly a dynasty could decline due to disputes over the throne.

Invasion of Azerbaijan
While Lotf Ali Khan was having problems with Kerman, Agha Mohammad Khan could thus freely focus on Azerbaijan. He appointed Baba Khan as the governor of Persian Iraq and marched into Azerbaijan in the spring of 1791. He stopped at Tarum, and sent his relative Suleiman Khan Quwanlu to make the Talysh Khanate acknowledge Qajar authority. Agha Mohammad Khan thereafter went to Sarab, where he forced the Sarab Khanate into submission. He then went to Ardabil, where he subdued the Ardabil Khanate and visited the city's shrine. He finally went to Qaradagh, where he brought an end to all resistance against him. He appointed the Donboli noble Hosayn Qoli Donboli as the governor of Khoy and Tabriz.

Conquest of Fars

While Agha Mohammad Khan was conquering Azerbaijan, Lotf Ali Khan used the opportunity to attack Isfahan. However Hajji Ebrahim Shirazi, the popular governor of Shiraz, used Lotf Ali Khan's absence from the city to stage a coup, while his brother Mohammad-Hosayn Shirazi, who was the Zand ruler's general, mutinied along with many other troops. Lotf Ali Khan rushed to Shiraz, but when he arrived at the city, its inhabitants refused to open the gates. He went into the mountains and raised an army large enough to capture Shiraz. Hajji Ebrahim then sent an emissary to Agha Mohammad Khan, asking him to become the ruler of Fars, offering to give him 3,000 mares if he accepted; he immediately did. When Agha Mohammad Khan arrived at Fars, he appointed Hajji Ebrahim as the governor of the whole province, and sent one of his men to take Lotf Ali Khan's family to Tehran, and take the possessions of the Zand family. Furthermore, he also ordered Baba Khan to establish a garrison in nearby Shiraz to be prepared to help Hajji Ebrahim if needed.

The Sheikh of Bushehr also took this opportunity to defect to the Qajars, although the reason for doing so is disputed.  Sheikh Naser II managed to establish control over Dashtestan, Kharg and Bandar Rig. He also attempted to take Khesht from January to June 1792, but his attempt to capture it failed and he returned to Bushehr on June 27.

In the meantime, Lotf Ali Khan had defeated the men sent by Hajji Ebrahim and had advanced towards the stronghold of Kazerun in late October and captured it. He then marched to the countryside outside Shiraz and prepared to starve the city. Some time later, the Qajar army from the nearby garrison attacked Lotf Ali Khan's men and were winning—until Lotf Ali Khan himself decided to participate in the battle, and the Qajar army was defeated. When Agha Mohammad Khan learned of this, he sent 7,000 horsemen to reinforce Hajji Ebrahim's forces, and also ordered the surviving Qajar forces from the nearby garrison to do the same.

Lotf Ali Khan let the reinforcements arrive to Shiraz, expecting that as soon as the forces of Hajji Ebrahim were strengthened, they would come out of Shiraz, and could be overwhelmed in open battle. He was correct in his prediction—a battle shortly took place to the west of Shiraz, where Lotf Ali Khan defeated the united forces of Hajji Ebrahim and his Qajar reinforcements. This took place in late 1791, or early 1792.

The inhabitants of Shiraz now faced extreme hardship from the siege, and it was questionable if they would endure. Large parts of Fars were ravaged by warfare, and for three to four years a pandemic had spread around the landscape. Albeit Lotf Ali Khan's forces had gone through as much difficulty as the forces of Hajji Ebrahim whose forces had begun to desert to the Zands. Agha Mohammad Khan thus raised a large army and marched into Fars. On 5 June 1792, Lotf Ali Khan, with a small force of his men, made a bold night raid on Agha Mohammad Khan's encampment near Persepolis.

At first, this choice seemed to be in Lotf Ali Khan's favor—he was certain that the Qajars were routed. In his delight at this, he let his men spread out and rest for the night, only to discover at daybreak that Agha Mohammad Khan still held his ground. Lotf Ali Khan then fled to Tabas through Neyriz. Agha Mohammad Khan set foot in Shiraz on 21 July 1792, and stayed there for a month, maintaining his retinue in the Bagh-e Vakil. Before leaving Shiraz, he appointed Hajji Ebrahim as the governor of Fars, and had the body of Karim Khan Zand exhumed and reburied in Tehran, where he went after his stay in Shiraz. Forces were sent to Kerman, Sistan, and Bam (although Qajar rule was not solidified in the last two places).

Conquest of Kerman 
Lotf Ali Khan had fled to Khorasan and received help from the chief of Tabas. With this help, he returned in September and marched towards Yazd. The governor of Yazd sent an army to defeat him, but near Ardakan they fled back to Yazd before an engagement even took place. Lotf Ali then captured Abarkuh and marched towards Bavanat in early October. The Qajar force sent against him wasted time besieging Abarkuh and Lotf Ali captured Stahbanat, Qir, and Neyriz. He marched on Darab and besieged the fortress but was soon informed of the Qajar army sent against him and fled back to Khorasan.

The Afghan chiefs of Bam invited Lotf Ali Khan to return and expel the Qajar yoke. With their help, Lotf Ali Khan returned to Kerman and captured the city on the 30th of March. Agha Mohammad Khan Qajar quickly heard of this and marched towards Kerman on May 14. The siege lasted four months and took a toll on Kerman's population. The city fell on 24 October, and Lotf Ali Khan quickly fled to Bam. However, the chief of Bam gave Lotf Ali Khan to the Qajars and ordered Lotf Ali Khan to be killed. Agha Mohammad Khan Qajar took revenge on the people of Kerman by ordering the eyes of 20,000 of the inhabitants. The city was brutally sacked and many beautiful buildings destroyed.

A year later, after the Battle of Krtsanisi brought eastern Georgia and the other principal territories in the North Caucasus and South Caucasus back within the Iranian domains, he proclaimed himself Shahanshah (King of Kings) on the Mughan plain, just as Nader Shah had done some sixty years earlier.

Final conquest of Azerbaijan

Reconquest of Georgia and the rest of the Caucasus
The country of Georgia had been under Iranian vassalage for the first time in the early modern era in 1502, and under intermittent Iranian rule and suzerainty since 1555, but had been de facto independent after the disintegration of the Iranian Afsharid dynasty.

For Agha Mohammad Khan, the resubjugation and reintegration of Georgia into the Iranian Empire was part of the same process that had brought Shiraz, Isfahan, and Tabriz under his rule. Like the Safavids and Nader Shah before him, he viewed the territories no differently than those in mainland Iran. Georgia was a province of Iran the same way Khorasan was. As the Cambridge History of Iran states, its permanent secession was inconceivable and had to be resisted in the same way as one would resist an attempt at the separation of Fars or Gilan. It was therefore natural for Agha Mohammad Khan to perform whatever was necessary in the Caucasus in order to subdue and reincorporate the recently lost regions following Nader Shah's death and the demise of the Zands. This included putting down what in Iranian eyes was seen as treason on the part of the wali of Georgia.

Finding an interval of peace amid their own quarrels and with northern, western, and central Iran secure, the Iranians demanded the Georgian monarch Heraclius II renounce his treaty with Russia and re-accept Iranian suzerainty, in return for peace and the security of his kingdom. The Ottomans, Iran's neighboring rival, recognized Iran's rights over Kartli and Kakheti for the first time in four centuries. Heraclius II appealed then to his theoretical protector, Empress Catherine II of Russia, pleading for at least 3,000 Russian troops, but he was not listened to, leaving Georgia to fend off the Iranian threat alone. Nevertheless, Heraclius II still rejected the Khan's ultimatum.

In August 1795, Agha Mohammad Khan crossed the Aras river with a 70,000-strong army. This force was divided in three: the left wing was sent in the direction of Erivan, the right one parallel to the Caspian Sea into the Mughan across the lower Aras towards Dagestan and Shirvan, while the Shah headed the centre force himself, advancing towards the fortress of Shusha in the Karabakh Khanate, which he besieged between 8 July and 9 August 1795. His right and left wing forced the Khans of Ganja and Erivan into an alliance. Having abandoned the siege of Shusha due to stiff resistance, which was further aided by Georgian crown prince Aleksandre, the Khan of Karabakh, Ibrahim Khan, eventually surrendered to Agha Mohammad Khan after discussions. He paid a regular tribute and surrendered hostages, though the Qajar forces were still denied entrance to Shusha. Since the main objective was Georgia, Agha Mohammad Khan was willing to have Karabakh secured by this agreement for now, for he and his army subsequently moved further. While at Ganja, having secured Shirvan, he was joined by Javad Khan Qajar and the rest of his right wing contingent. At Ganja, Mohammad Khan sent Heraclius II his last ultimatum, which he received in September 1795:

According to the author of the Fārsnāma-ye Nāṣeri, Ḥasan-e Fasāʼi, a contemporary Qajar era historian, Agha Mohammad Khan had declared in the letter:

His advisors divided, Heraclius II ignored the ultimatum but sent couriers to St.Petersburg. Gudovich, who sat in Georgievsk at the time, instructed Heraclius II to avoid "expense and fuss", while Heraclius II, together with Solomon II and some Imeretians headed southwards of Tbilisi to fend off the Iranians.

At the same time, Agha Mohammad Khan marched directly on Tbilisi, with half of the army he crossed the Aras river. Some estimate his army had 40,000 men instead of 35,000. They attacked the heavily fortified Georgian positions of Heraclius II and Solomon on the southwestern limits of the city. Abandoned by several of his nobles, Heraclius II managed to mobilize around 5,000 troops, including some 2,000 auxiliaries from the neighbouring Imereti under its King Solomon II, a member of the Georgian Bagrationi Dynasty and thus distantly related to Heraclius II. The Georgians offered a desperate resistance and succeeded in rolling back a series of Iranian attacks on 9 and 10 September. After that, it is said that some traitors informed the Iranians that the Georgians had no more strength to fight and the Qajar army cancelled their plan of returning to Iran. Early on 11 September, Agha Mohammad Khan personally led an all-out offensive against the Georgians. Amid an artillery duel and a fierce cavalry charge, the Iranians managed to cross the Kura River and outflanked the decimated Georgian army. Heraclius II attempted to mount a counterattack, but he had to retreat to the last available positions in the outskirts of Tbilisi. By nightfall, the Georgian forces had been exhausted and almost completely destroyed. The last surviving Georgian artillery briefly held the advancing Iranians to allow Heraclius II and his retinue of some 150 men to escape through the city to the mountains. The fighting continued in the streets of Tbilisi and at the fortress of Narikala. In a few hours, Agha Mohammad Khan was in full control of the Georgian capital, which was then completely sacked and its population massacred. The Iranian army marched back laden with spoil and carrying off some 15,000 captives. The Georgians had lost 4,000 men in the battle, the Iranians 13,000; a third of their total force.

An eye-witness, having entered the city several days the bulk of the Iranian troops had withdrawn, described what he saw:

Conquest of Khorasan
Agha Mohammad Shah now focused on Khorasan, which was under the rule of Nader Shah's blind and old grandson Shahrokh Shah. He had earlier been a vassal of the Durrani ruler, Ahmad Shah, but after the latter's death in 1772 had become a pawn of the chieftains who had taken control of the surrounding cities and towns of the Afsharid capital of Mashhad. The most prominent of these chieftains was most likely Eshaq Khan, who preserved Torbat-e Heydarieh as his center of operations. In the eastern parts of the Alborz, Kurdish chieftains ruled over several fortresses, such as Bojnord and Quchan. 

Agha Mohammad Shah first marched to Astarabad, and penalized the Turkmens who had been pillaging the city and its surroundings. He then continued to Mashhad, where the local chieftains, who knew of it was hopeless to resist, swiftly acknowledged his rule. Agha Mohammad Shah also demanded these local chieftains dispatch him hostages, who were sent to Tehran. When Agha Mohammad Shah reached Mashhad, Shahrokh, along with a prominent mujtahid named Mirza Mehdi, went to the Qajar encampment. There they were warmly received by Agha Mohammad Shah's nephew Hossein Qoli Khan.

Shortly afterwards, Agha Mohammad Shah sent a force of 8,000 soldiers under Suleiman Khan Qajar, followed by Mirza Mehdi, to conquer Mashhad and affirm its citizens of the Shah's generosity. A day later, Agha Mohammad Shah, followed the customary of the famous Iranian shah Abbas I the Great, and entered Mashhad on May 14 by foot as a pilgrim to the Imam Reza shrine, whilst being teary eyed and kissing the ground. His pilgrimage continued for 23 days, where he seemed to be unaware of the politics of the country.

The torture of Shahrokh Shah
However, things quickly changed. Agha Mohammad Shah ordered the exhumation of Nader Shah's corpse, and had it sent to Tehran, where it was reburied alongside Karim Khan Zand's corpse. He then forced Shahrokh to give him any riches that originally belonged to Nader Shah. Shahrokh swore that he did not possess any more of Nader Shah's riches. Agha Mohammad Shah, ruthless and revengeful, and with a desire for treasure, did not believe him. He had Shahrokh Shah hurt severely to confess the hidden locations of the last gems that had passed down to him from his grandfather. Shahrokh, however, refused to speak. Agha Mohammad Shah was personally involved in the torture and on one occasion he had Shahrokh tied to a chair, his head shaved and a crown of thick paste built on his head. He then poured a jug of molten lead into the crown. A number of Shahrokh's servants, who were struck with misery for their previous monarch, sent an admired mullah of the city to make an emotional appeal to Agha Mohammad Shah in support of Shahrokh and Shahrokh was sent to Mazandaran with his family. Shahrokh died at Damghan due to the injuries he had suffered during his torture.

Rest of reign
Agha Mohammad Khan restored Iran to a unity it had not had since Karim Khan. He reunited the territory of contemporary Iran and the Caucasus region which had been part of the concept of Iran for centuries. He was, however, a man of extreme violence who killed almost all who could threaten his hold on power, a trait he showed in several of his campaigns. A year after Agha Mohammad Khan re-subjugated the Caucasus, he also captured Khorasan. Shah Rukh, ruler of Khorasan and grandson of Nader Shah, was tortured to death because Agha Mohammad Khan thought that he knew of Nadir's legendary treasures.

In 1786, Agha Mohammad Khan moved his capital from Sari in his home province of Mazandaran to Tehran. He was the first Iranian ruler to make Tehran—the successor to the great city of Ray—his capital, although both the Safavids and the Zands had expanded the town and built palaces there. One of the main reasons noted for moving the capital farther south was to remain in close reach of Azarbaijan and Iran's integral Caucasian territories in the North Caucasus and South Caucasus, at that time not yet ceded to Imperial Russia, their fate in the course of the 19th century. He was formally crowned in 1796 and founded the Qajar dynasty.

Although the Russians briefly took and occupied Derbent and Baku during the expedition of 1796 under the command of count Valerian Zubov, Agha Mohammad Khan successfully expanded Iranian influence into the Caucasus, reasserting Iranian sovereignty over its former dependencies in the region. He was, however, a notoriously cruel ruler, who reduced Tbilisi to ashes, while massacring and carrying away its Christian population, much as he had done with his Muslim subjects. He based his strength on tribal manpower like Genghis Khan, Timur and Nader Shah.

Assassination
Agha Mohammad's successful reign was short-lived, as he was assassinated in 1797 in his tent in the city of Shusha, the capital of the Karabakh khanate, three days after he had taken the city, and less than three years after he had taken power. According to Hasan-e Fasa'i's' Farsnama-ye Naseri, during Agha Mohammad's stay in Shusha, one night a quarrel arose between a Georgian servant named Sadegh Gorji and the valet Khodadad-e Esfahani. They raised their voices to such a pitch that the shah became angry and ordered both to be executed. Sadeq Khan-e Shaghaghi, a prominent emir, interceded on their behalf, but was not listened to. The shah, however, ordered their execution to be postponed until Saturday, as this happened to be the evening of Friday (the Islamic holy day), and ordered them back to their duties in the royal pavilion, unfettered and unchained, awaiting their execution the next day. From experience, however, they knew that the King would keep to what he had ordered, and, having no hope, they turned to boldness. When the shah was sleeping, they were joined by the valet Abbas-e Mazandarani, who was in the plot with them, and the three invaded the royal pavilion and with dagger and knife murdered the shah.

His nephew, crowned as Fath-Ali Shah Qajar, succeeded him.

Personality and appearance 
Agha Mohammad Khan's castration at the age of six had left him permanently damaged, both physically and mentally. His body was sick and weak. He suffered from epilepsy and fell unconscious for three days in 1790/91 due to a stroke. Regardless, he was a determined figure and attempted to hide his frailty. Due to his small stature, he could be mistaken for a young boy from a far enough distance. This seemingly annoyed him to a great extent, especially if a person kept looking at him.

He was interested in hunting and literature. During the night when Agha Mohammad Khan was on his bed, the Shahnameh would be read aloud to him.

Government

The bureaucracy
The bureaucracy remained small during the reign of Agha Mohammad Shah—apart from the grand vizier, the leading figures of the administration were the chief revenue officer (mustaufī) and the muster-master (lashkarnevīs) of the army. Only one person occupied each post during Agha Mohammad Shah's reign; Hajji Ebrahim, who served as grand vizier; Mirza Ismail, who served as the chief revenue officer, and Mirza Asad-Allah Nuri, who served as muster-master. Since Agha Mohammad Shah was primarily busy with his military expeditions, his court was constantly his camp, and Hajji Ebrahim, along with other officials, usually participated in his campaigns.

Provincial administration

During Agha Mohammad Shah's reign, provincial administration followed the same model of the Safavid one; beglerbegis were appointed to govern provinces. A city was under the rule of a kalantar and darugha, while its quarters was under the rule of the kadkhuda. Governorship of provinces went for the most part to tribal chieftains—this was later changed by Fath-Ali Shah Qajar, who appointed many of his relatives as governors.

Military
Agha Mohammad Shah was more of a military leader than politician, and was known for his determined sovereignty, instead of a charismatic one. His military prowess was highly noticeable—Malcolm's evaluation, which was written some years after his death, says the following: "His army was inured to fatigue, and regularly paid; he had introduced excellent arrangement into all its Departments, and his known severity occasioned the utmost alacrity and promptness in the execution of orders, and had he lived a few more years, it is difficult to conjecture the progress of his arms."

The Scottish traveller James Baillie Fraser also says the following thing about him: "Agha Mohammad had likewise the talent of forming good and brave troops. His active and ambitious disposition kept his army constantly engaged; and they acquired a veteran hardihood and expertness, that rendered them superior to any other Asiatic troops."

Construction
Agha Mohammad Shah did not construct or repair much during his reign, due to the campaigns and battles which occupied his time. In Tehran, he ordered the creation of a mosque named the Masjid-e Shah (meaning "the Shah's mosque"), while in Mashhad he ordered the reparation of the Imam Reza shrine. In Astarabad, he repaired (or fortified) the walls, emptied the ditch, built several buildings, one of them being a palace for the governor. Furthermore, he also improved the overall condition of the city. He did something similar in Babol, Ashraf and Sari. Of all these constructions and reparations, his best and most lasting achievement is debatably making Tehran his capital, which to this day is the country's capital and largest city.

References

Sources

Further reading
 
 

1742 births
1797 deaths
1797 murders in Asia
18th-century monarchs of Persia
18th-century monarchs in the Middle East
18th-century murdered monarchs
Assassinated Iranian politicians
Battle of Krtsanisi
Deaths by stabbing in Azerbaijan
Deaths by stabbing in Iran
Murdered Persian monarchs
People from Gorgan
People murdered in Azerbaijan
People murdered in Iran
People of the Russo-Persian Wars
Iranian eunuchs
Mohammad Khan
Prisoners and detainees of the Zand dynasty